Queen Oronsen is an orisha from 
Yoruba mythology. She was the spouse of Olowo Rerengejen. The annual Igogo festival in Owo is celebrated in her honour.

A Series Of Excerpts From The Oral Records Of Owo

References

Yoruba goddesses
People from Owo
Yoruba queens